Guru Basadi is a basadi or Jain temple located in Moodabidri town in the Indian state of Karnataka. The Guru basadi is the oldest amongst 18 Jain basadis in Moodabidri built in 714 CE. This temple is near the another famous Jain temple, Saavira Kambada Basadi.

History 
Guru Basadi is the earliest of the Jain monuments built in  CE. According to Jain legend, a Jain monk from the 8th century was noticed a cow and a tiger drinking water from the same spot, tiger feeding the calf and cow feeding the tiger cubs while roaming a thick forest. Observing this miracle, the monk got the place excavated and idol of Parshvanatha was found in the area and a temple was consecrated here.

An inscription dated back to 1307 CE inside Tirthankar Basadi mentions Guru Basadi receiving grants. The manastambha inside the temple was erected in 1615 CE. The temple also houses the rare Jain palm leaf manuscripts of 12th century CE known as ‘Dhavala texts’ are preserved. These texts were brought from shravanabelagola to here during Mughal invasion. This basadi is also called Siddantha Basadi and Hale Basadi.

Architecture 

The Guru Basadi is almost as large as the famous Saavira Kambada Basadi located near the Guru Basadi. The temple is a rectangular structure with three mandapa leading to garbhagriha that houses an  idol of Parshvanatha as the moolnayak of the temple. The outer hall is supported by beautifully carved pillars. The temple entrance has finely carved columns that supports a sloped roof. The temple houses a manasthambha in front of the temple entrance.
This temple houses miniature idols of many Jain Tirthankars.

Siddhanta Basadi inside Guru Basadi enshrines idol of Tirthankars made of gold, emerald and other precious stones. The temple also houses an idol dating back to the 2nd century BCE. The temple complex also include small temples dedicated to Saraswati and Padmavati.

Legacy 
The temple is significant for appointment of the Head of Jain Matha, and coronations of Jain Bhattaraka.

Gallery

See also

 Jain Bunt
 Chaturmukha Basadi
 Saavira Kambada Basadi

References

Citation

Sources

Book

Web

External links

Jain temples in Karnataka
8th-century Jain temples